Mannanthala is a suburb of Thiruvananthapuram, the capital of Kerala, India.

It is located on the Main Central Road, after Nalanchira, in the direction of Kottayam. It is connected to the city by buses run by Kerala State Road Transport Corporation from the Thampanoor and East Fort bus depots. The nearest airport is Thiruvananthapuram International Airport.

Prominent institutions and places of interest include:
 Anandavalleswaram Devi Temple
 Government Press
 Vayambachira Pond
 Government High School
 Mar Ivanios College
 Mar baselios College
 St.Rita's Malankara Catholic Church , Aruviyode

References

External links
 About Mannanthala

Suburbs of Thiruvananthapuram